Atento is a global provider of customer relationship management (CRM) and business-process outsourcing (BPO) services, including customer care, sales, collections, back office and technical support. Atento is the largest provider in Latin America, and among the top five providers globally, based on revenues. The Company tops the Latin American market with 17.3% market share at the regional level according to Frost & Sullivan. Atento's CEO is Dimitrius Oliveira.

Since 1999, the company has developed its business model in 13 countries where it employs 150,000 people. Atento has over 400 clients to whom it offers CRM/BPO services through multiple channels. Atento's clients are mostly multinational corporations in sectors such as telecommunications, banking and financial services, health, retail and public administrations, among others.

The company trades under the symbol ATTO on the New York Stock Exchange (NYSE) and operates through three segments: EMEA, Americas and Brazil.

History

In 2000, Atento was launched in Spain, when Telefónica grouped its call center business in Spain and other Latin American countries into a subsidiary business unit.

Sale and flotation 
In October 2012, Telefónica agreed to sell Atento to Bain Capital for $1.3bn. Under the terms of the deal, Atento would continue to provide services to the Telefónica Group for at least nine years after the agreement.

In September 2014, Atento announces launch of Initial Public Offering (IPO). In October, the company filed with the U.S. Securities and Exchange Commissions for a $300 million IPO. Atento hired the investment-banking units of Morgan Stanley & Co (MS.N), Credit Suisse Group AG CSGN.VX and Brazil's Itaú Unibanco Holding SA (ITUB4.SA) to handle the transaction.

December 11, 2014. Atento announced the sale of its operations in the Czech Republic to Comdata SPA

Operations command centers and customer experience centers 
In 2015, Atento opened "operations command centers" in São Paulo, Mexico City and Madrid, centralizing the management of over 80 "customer relationship centers" located in more than 10 different countries. Also that year, the company opened its first "customer experience solutions center" in Mexico.

Atento Digital 
Atento Digital was launched in 2017. It is the company's business unit focused on driving growth for clients across verticals and geographies through the integration of all of Atento's digital assets.

Locations
Atento has 93 contact centers in 13 countries:  Argentina, Brazil, Chile, Colombia, El Salvador, Guatemala, Mexico, Morocco, Panama, Peru, Puerto Rico, Spain, United States and Uruguay.

Acquisitions and Partnerships 
In 2016 Atento acquired a majority stake in R Brasil Solucoes to expand collections and digital collections capabilities.

In 2017 the company announced an agreement to acquire a majority stake in Interfile to expand back office automation and credit origination capabilities. Interfile is a provider of BPO services for large clients in the banking and financial services sector in Brazil.

Strategic Partnerships 
In 2018, the company announced a strategic partnership with Keepcon, a semantic technology provider, to expand artificial intelligence and automatization capabilities of its omnichannel platform.

In the same year, Atento and Falconi signed an alliance to provide integrated management consulting and outsourcing services for all types of organizations.

In 2018, Atento also reached a partnership with T-System, on the provision of data center services in Brazil, and with Unimed Rio in Brazil to modernize its customer relationship structure.

Divestments 
In 2014 Atento announced the sale of its operations in the Czech Republic to Comdata SPA to continue strengthening its focus on its core markets.

In 2015 Atento announced the sale of its operations in Morocco to Intelcia Group. Atento's operations in Morocco, which provide services to the Spanish market were excluded from the transaction and continue operating as part of Atento Spain.

Awards and recognitions 
Atento has subsequently been recognized by Great Place to Work® as one of the 25 World's Best Multinational Workplaces in 5 different occasions and one of the 25 Latin America Best Multinationals to Work for 8 consecutive years. The company has also been recognized as one of the Best Workplaces in some of the countries where it operates, including Spain, Brazil or Argentina. The company has maintained the recognition by Great Place to Work® in Uruguay, Mexico, Peru, Chile, Colombia and Central America and the Caribbean.

The company has also been awarded several times the IMT awards in Mexico, ABEMD awards in Brazil, CRC Gold Awards, including as Best Customer Service Outsourcer in Spain in 2018 and ranked as the second most innovative company in Brazil's service sector, according to Valor Econômico.

Also for several years has Atento been named a Leader in Gartner's Magic Quadrant for Customer Management Contact Center BPO.

References

External links
 

1999 establishments in Spain
Companies listed on the New York Stock Exchange